was a samurai of the Hōjō clan who fought both for and against the Imperial Court. His father was Hōjō Takatoki, last Shogunal Regent and de facto ruler of the Kamakura shogunate.

Tokiyuki had fought against both the Imperial forces and those of the Ashikaga in order to save the Kamakura shogunate, of which his clan had been the de facto ruler for over a century. After the 1333 siege of Kamakura, his father's suicide and the almost complete destruction of his family, he escaped to Shinano Province and the home of Suwa Yorishige, where he gathered an army with which to return and try to regain power. He re-entered Kamakura in 1335, forcing Ashikaga Tadayoshi to flee before he was forced to flee himself by Tadayoshi's elder brother and future shōgun Ashikaga Takauji. 

Shortly after his defeat, Tokiyuki asked to be pardoned by Emperor Go-Daigo, and formally entered into the service of the Southern Court (then rival of Ashikaga shougunate), fighting under the command of Kitabatake Akiie, and later Prince Munenaga. He also aided in the 1352 recapture of Kamakura, led by Nitta Yoshioki. However, when Nitta was pursued by Ashikaga Takauji and sought refuge in Echigo Province, Tokiyuki fled to Sagami Province, where he was discovered and beheaded by forces loyal to the Ashikaga.

In Popular Culture 
Hōjō Tokiyuki is the protagonist of The Elusive Samurai, a manga series that started in January 2021. He is portrayed as a young man who is talented in fleeing and hiding.

See also 
Yokoi Yayū. The Yokoi clan is believed to descend from Hōjō Tokiyuki.
The Elusive Samurai - A manga series loosely based on the tales of Hōjō Tokiyuki.
Later Hōjō clan

References

Further reading
 
Nussbaum, Louis-Frédéric (2002). "Japan Encyclopedia". Cambridge, Massachusetts: Harvard University Press.
Papinot, Edmond. (1910). Historical and geographical dictionary of Japan. Tokyo: Librarie Sansaisha.

Tokiyuki
Year of birth unknown
1353 deaths
Recipients of Japanese royal pardons